is a Japanese manga series written and illustrated by Nobuyuki Fukumoto. It has been serialized in Kodansha's seinen manga magazine Weekly Young Magazine since February 1996. The story centers on Kaiji Itō, a consummate gambler and his misadventures around gambling. The Kaiji manga consists of six series; the current series, Tobaku Datenroku Kaiji: 24 Oku Dasshutsu-hen, started in 2017.

The first two manga series were adapted into two anime television series of 26 episodes each, produced by Madhouse and broadcast on Nippon TV; Kaiji: Ultimate Survivor aired from October 2007 to April 2008, and Kaiji: Against All Rules aired from April to September 2011. Kaiji was also adapted into a live-action film trilogy, directed by Toya Sato and starring Tatsuya Fujiwara as the titular protagonist. Kaiji premiered in October 2009; Kaiji 2 premiered in November 2011; and Kaiji: Final Game premiered in January 2020. A more loosely adapted Chinese live-action film, titled Animal World, starring Li Yifeng and Michael Douglas, premiered in June 2018. In North America, the first manga series was licensed for English release by Denpa, being released in a six-volume omnibus edition, with the first volume published in November 2019. Sentai Filmworks licensed both seasons of the anime television series in 2020.

By January 2019, Kaiji had over 21.5 million copies in circulation, making it one of the best-selling manga series. In 1998, the manga received the 22nd Kodansha Manga Award for the general category.

Plot

Japan, February 1996. Three years after graduating from high school and moving to Tokyo to get a job, Kaiji Itō fails to find steady employment due to the country being mired in its first recession since World War II. Depressed, he festers in his apartment, biding his time with cheap pranks, gambling, liquor and cigarettes. Kaiji is always thinking about money and his perpetual poverty frequently brings him to tears. Kaiji's unrelenting misery continues until he is paid an unexpected visit from a loan shark named Yūji Endō, who wants to collect an outstanding debt that Kaiji has carelessly co-signed for his former co-worker. Endō gives Kaiji two options – either spend ten years repaying this outstanding debt, or board the gambling ship Espoir ("hope" in French) for one night to clear the debt. Using a con, Endō pressures Kaiji into accepting the deal, believing he will never come back from the voyage.

However, Kaiji survives the gamble and is invited to another gambling night, this time at Starside Hotel. Although initially wary about the offer, he is spurred by his acquaintance Sahara to go. After being the only survivor of the Human Derby, Kaiji decides to avenge his friends by competing in another gambling match the financing corporation known as Teiai Group has prepared: E-Card. Kaiji, despite losing an ear, defeats his opponent Yukio Tonegawa, the second highest ranking executive at Teiai. He goes all-in once again in a new game with Kazutaka Hyōdō, the president of Teiai, but this time loses both the money he had won in E-Card and four of his fingers.

Though Kaiji survives the events at Starside Hotel he now has a debt of over 9.5 million yen. He contacts Endō in hopes of being able to take part in another high-stakes gamble, though Endō betrays him and sends him to Teiai's underground labor camp where he will have to work off his debt for 15 years. In the labor camp Kaiji is paid 91,000 perica (equal to 9100 yen) per month to dig an underground kingdom. This is reduced to 45,000 perica after Kaiji loses to Ōtsuki in Underground Cee-lo. However, Kaiji allies himself with other Forty-fivers (those earning 45,000 perica per month) to defeat Ōtsuki and win enough money for a one-day outside pass.

Although Kaiji manages to get out of the labor camp with 800,000 yen on hand using multiple one-day outside passes, he only has 20 days to earn the 60 million yen he needs to buy his freedom and release the other Forty-fivers. Fortunately, Kaiji comes across Kōtarō Sakazaki, a man who tells him of a pachinko game known as the Bog in a high-stakes casino where Kaiji can win over 500 million yen. Kaiji agrees to help him beat the Bog. However, the casino is owned by Teiai, and the Bog has been rigged in several ways by the manager of the casino, Seiya Ichijō, and his men to ensure that it will not pay out. Kaiji succeeds at beating the Bog after a long battle and Ichijō is sent to the underground labor camp working for 1050 years to pay back the 700 million yen from the Bog that Kaiji won. However, Endō drugs Kaiji and takes away the majority of his winnings as debt payment for the amount he loaned Kaiji to win the Bog.

Months after the events and finally having cleared his debt, Kaiji has been living with Sakazaki and his family until he kicks Kaiji out with 3 million yen in cash. Kaiji then agrees to help the former Forty-fivers Miyoshi and Maeda beat Takashi Muraoka, the president of a casino at his Minefield Mahjong game and potentially win over 100 million yen. After losing sums of money during the game, Kaiji realizes that the game was rigged from the start in Muraoka's favor, with Maeda looking at Kaiji's tiles and giving information to Muraoka and Miyoshi sending false signals to Kaiji. Kazuya Hyōdō, the son of Kazutaka Hyōdō, who was in the same room with Kaiji and the rest, loans him money to continue gambling, and after several matches, Kaiji is finally able to defeat Muraoka and wins 480 million yen through a pure stroke of luck.

Kazuya offers Kaiji an opportunity to gamble with him, to which Kaiji accepts and follows him. Kazuya reveals to Kaiji his twisted and bloodthirsty personality and how despicable he thinks human beings are. He decides to test his view on human nature with a life-or-death game called Salvation Game, with three friends indebted to him, Mario, Chang and Mitsuyama, and see if their friendship is a true bond. Kaiji is an observer to this game and cheers on the three men to challenge Kazuya's corrupted views. However, after several rounds, Mitsuyama ends up failing to put his trust into his friends and betrays them, taking all the money of the game and leaving them behind to die. Kaiji instinctively saves Mario and Chang from death, and before going with Kazuya to a warehouse and do their gamble, Kaiji asks them to join and support him to defeat Kazuya.

Kaiji and Kazuya play a game called One Poker, and after several matches with Kaiji close to death, he finally overthrows Kazuya. Nevertheless, Kaiji, in an act of mercy, saves Kazuya from dying with the help of Mario and Chang. While Kazuya lies unconscious, they escape with 2.4 billion yen. Enraged after he found out what happened, Hyōdō commands the blacksuits and Endō to chase after them and get the money back. Kaiji, Chang and Mario, on the run from Teiai and after many trails and evasions from them, realize that they have an army of debtors who relentlessly look for everywhere Kaiji, Chang and Mario go. Consequently, Kaiji is planning to leave Japan for good after Chang and Mario go back to their countries.

Gambles
Series 1

The gambling tournament during the night Kaiji spends on Espoir, has an average survival rate of 50%. The rules were outlined after the issuing of war funds, which were done a minimum of 1,000,000¥ and 10,000,000¥. The money was in effect a loan, equaling the debt of the contestant and compounded at 1.5% every ten minutes for the four-hour voyage; contestants who hold onto their funds for the length of the trip would have to pay 140% of what they invested, thus putting an incentive to finish games early. Money that exceeded the amount needed to repay the loan to the Espoir hosts would be pocketed by the contestant.
The rules of the game are similar to the original rock paper scissors game but with a twist – the hand gestures are represented by cards, and contestants are given twelve cards, four of each gesture. Contestants are also given three plastic stars as collateral to bet on each round of play – whenever a player loses a round, the winner gets a star from the loser. To survive the night, contestants must retain their three star pendants and use all of their gesture cards. Cards cannot be destroyed or thrown away, to do so is subject to instant disqualification.
Due to the simple nature of the game, single matches can be completed within ten seconds, and players can win or lose in a matter of minutes. Winners are allowed to go upstairs, where any extra star pendants are exchanged for cash and they lounge in a small cafe. In the event of a loss, individuals are taken away to a back room by men in black suits.

In contrast to Restricted Rock Paper Scissors, contestants are not briefed on the rules of the Human Derby, and are unaware of the nature of the gamble until they accept participating in it. Contestants are loaded into numbered "coffins" and are elevated several floors up the Starside Hotel to a platform overlooking a concrete courtyard. Contestants are expected to walk across four long, steel beams – the first to arrive on the other side of the beam nets 20,000,000¥, the second place finisher 10,000,000¥. The steel beams become more narrow as the contestants begin to cross them, though touching the beam with hands at any time disqualifies the contestant. The pushing of contestants to get out of the way is not forbidden but is in fact encouraged, since the contestants (the "horses") are being bet on by spectators below, who enjoy the struggle to the other side. Contestants who fall from the beams suffer severe injury – depending on how and where they land, their injuries can range from serious to fatal.
Once the winners of the first leg of the race have been identified, they are given coupons redeemable for their prize with a set time limit. To cash the coupons, the contestants must cross similar but more dangerous steel beams twenty two stories or 75 meters above the ground and 25 meters long. Falling from this narrow bridge means instant death. Since the hosts concluded that the crossing of the bridge would not be entertaining if the contestants could give up and use their hands to assist in their retreat off the bridge, a strong electric current is run through the steel beams – while not powerful enough to cause serious injury or be fatal, the current is enough to stun contestants, causing them to lose balance and fall from the bridge. Psychologically, this bridge is much more challenging because of the greater peril involved, where the end of the bridge is not the end goal, rather, a glass stairway is set up at the end that reveals the true end goal but due to the dark lighting, it is hard to make out and requires a leap of faith in order to reach.

The game is meant to be a simplification of society that Kazutaka Hyōdō refers to right before the game begins. The Emperor has ultimate power to give money (i.e. most powerful card). Citizens cannot disobey him because they want money (i.e. Emperor card beats the Citizen card). The Slave has nothing to lose and has no use of money, therefore the slave can defeat the Emperor (i.e. Slave card beats the Emperor card but loses to the Citizen card). Each hand is played with one side having four Citizen cards and an Emperor card (Emperor side). The other side having four Citizen cards and a Slave card (Slave side). Since it is much harder for the slave side to win (as Slave cards can only defeat Emperor cards) the players of the Slave side get five times more winnings. The game consists of 12 matches, 4 sets of three, where the players alternate between the Slave side and the Emperor side. In each set of 3 rounds, each player must place down one of the 5 cards in their hand until one emerges as the winner of that match. As Kaiji did not have enough money to match the bet, he was given the choice of losing an eye or an ear instead.

Unlike the other gambles, this gamble is made by Kaiji himself. After completing E-Card he prepares to leave the hotel but then steps on a tissue box and notices that its sides are open, which he finds fascinating. Upon further investigation of the box Kaiji decides to challenge Hyōdō to a raffle gamble with the tissue box as the container for the lots made of small torn squares of paper towel. The winning piece had a circle drawn on it.
Series 2

A variation on the dice game, Cee-lo, this game was crafted by Ōtsuki, the foreman of Kaiji's work team in the underground labor camp. Notable rule variations include that the dealer is not fixed and each player can take a turn as dealer. However, each player may opt to pass their turn as dealer, but if they agree to play dealer, then they must be dealer two consecutive times.

An elaborate Pachinko game in a high-stakes casino featuring a payout of 100% of the earnings from the machine. Taking this into consideration the house has set up state-of-the-art countermeasures to ensure victory; such as tightening the nails to ensure only 1 in 100 balls go in, using flippers to knock away balls, and tilting the three bottom plates to prevent any balls dropping through the winning holes. Previously only two people have ever beaten the Bog; Hyōdō and Tonegawa. Each ball is worth 1000 times more than a normal Pachinko machine, ¥4000 (around $39), but the payout is 100 million balls. When Kaiji first comes across the Bog the jackpot is ¥550 million but when he plays it, the jackpot has risen to over ¥700 million.
Series 3

A variation of Japanese Mahjong where the game is played by two players who make their best hand from a random draw of 34 tiles. Players do not draw a tile as usual, but instead take turns discarding the 17 leftover tiles from the 34 tiles used to build their hands. Because no tiles are drawn, a hand can only be won by declaring ron on a winning tile discarded by the opponent. A winning hand must reach mangan or higher in order to be valid. If neither player achieves ron after 17 turns, the game becomes a draw, the tiles are reshuffled, and the current wager is doubled.
Series 4

A game that appears in the in-universe novel written by Kazuya Hyōdō. The novel is based on the punishments that Kazuya actually enforced, with a changed setting and character names, making the story ostensibly fictional. The gamble uses two boxes with two sword holes in the feet and five in the body, nine steel plates and nine swords. Two players go into their respective boxes and take turns designating the holes into which the swords will be pierced. The player can choose their own hole as well as their opponent's. In addition, 9 of the 14 holes have a steel plate in them, so that even if the sword is stabbed into one of the holes, it will not pierce the body, so if all nine swords are stabbed into holes with a steel plate, both players will end up unharmed. However, the remaining five holes do not have an iron plate in them, and stabbing a sword in one of them will stab the player, which will result in serious injury in the case of the legs, and death, though not necessarily instantaneous, in the case of the body.

A life-or-death game designed by Kazuya to test if the friendship between three men indebted to Kazuya--Mario, from the Philippines, Chang, from China, and Mitsuyama, from Japan--is a true bond. The three men sit in a stair case formation, strapped to their seats with seat belts which can only be released one at a time with a release button, and are not allowed to look behind them. They each wear a helmet with a light on the top. At the start of each round of the game, the current pot is doubled, and of the three men, one "savior" and two "hostages" is decided via the light on their helmets. The savior must release their seat belt after 30 seconds, but before 60, and press a button across the room, otherwise the helmets of the two hostages will crush their heads. They must use the powers of deduction and observation to determine if they are the savior or the hostage--the player at the top of the staircase is in the best position for this, as he can see the two other players' lights. Halfway through the game, Kazuya reveals that, if the savior fails to rescue the two hostages, he gets double the entire pot of the current round. Kaiji is brought in as an observer to this game, and frequently cheers on the three men and challenges Kazuya's corrupted view of human nature.
Series 5

 A card game using two standard decks of playing cards, designed by Kazuya. Rather than deciding the victor via hands such as Straight, Flush, etc., each hand consists of just one card and is ranked according to its normal value, suits not factoring into the value at all. In addition, like in the earlier E-Card game, the absolute weakest card actually beats the absolute strongest card--a 2 is the absolute weakest, and an ace is the absolute strongest, so the 2 wins against an ace. If both players play a card of equal value, it is a tie. At the start of each round, players have two cards, and must play one of them, the most valuable card being the winner. Lights in front of each player indicate whether their cards are "up" (higher value) or "down" (lower value). Standard poker betting rules apply and the cards of both players are always revealed after betting even if one player folds (but they do not affect the outcome in that case). In addition, all of this is played at the top of a large tower, on a mechanical shuffling table Kazuya has designed, which he names "Mother Sophie". The table is placed on a set of tracks, and moves towards the loser's side edge with each loss.
Films

An original gamble that appears in the live-action film Kaiji 2. The attraction, which takes place in the underworld casino where Ichijō is the manager, is the "New Brave Men Road" which replaces Steel Beam Crossing. Inspired by Frank R. Stockton's short story "The Lady, or the Tiger?", the game involves a "slave" (heavily indebted challenger) being trapped with his feet shackled in a room with no way out in front of three cages and buttons. The slave can press only one of the three buttons, which open a cage corresponding to it. If the cage containing a "princess" (the challenger's companion) is opened, the slave will be released with 30 million in prize money, but the other cages contain lions who will attack and kill the slave if freed. The princess is notified on the spot which button is the right one, and can inform the slave about it. However, there is no guarantee that the princess will truthfully tell the slave which is the correct button, because if the slave dies, she will be awarded 3 million. The slave must correctly determine the truth of the princess's statement or else endanger his life. There does not appear to be any reason for the princess to betray the slave in terms of the amount of money they can get, but since the slaves are supposed to be chosen from those who are heavily indebted, even if they win the 30 million, it is assumed that most if not all of the amount will go towards paying off the debt.

An original game that appears in the live-action film Kaiji: Final Game. Participants compete for cards stuck to the tops of poles erected around the city.

An original game that appears in the live-action film Kaiji: Final Game. Players select one of the ten ropes and get dropped in a bungee jumping fashion. There is a one-in-ten chance that the person who picked the right rope will be able to survive, but the others will fall from a high ground to their deaths.

An original game that appears in the live-action film Kaiji: Final Game. Two participants, who are in a rivalry with each other in terms of assets, convert all of their wealth into gold bars and compete to weigh them on a scale. The main feature of this game is that the players can attach supporters to the game, and the key is for the player to be able to persuade their opponent's supporters to join their own team. There are three main types of supporters: "Friends", "Fixers", and "Family" who can turn cash, works of art, land deeds, and other valuables into gold bars using a state-of-the-art grading machine. There is also a "Fan" type where the spectators vote by throwing gold coins into the scale of the side they think will win. The gold coins are numbered so that it is clear who threw them into which scale. If the winning side gets voted on when the polls close, they will receive twice the amount of their lump sum. However, if voted with a gold coin and it falls to the ground without being placed on the scale, it will be forfeited by Teiai.

An original game that appears in the live-action film Kaiji: Final Game. This is a gamble that Kōsuke Takakura frequently plays for entertainment purposes, with the rules not deviating much from those of a normal rock paper scissors game, but the player must hold a handful of solid gold in one of the three rounds of the game, which means they must play Rock in at least one of those rounds. If the player holds the gold and wins with Rock, they can get that gold as a bonus.

Production

At the start of serialization, Nobuyuki Fukumoto was 37, and he had a track record of gambling manga, including Ten, Akagi and Gin to Kin. Originally, it was planned to be a short story based on the first game of the series, "restricted rock–paper–scissors", but Fukumoto told to his chief editor at Kodansha that he found it difficult to fit the story in a few chapters. Eventually, the plan to make it a serialized manga was decided in November 1995, and Kaiji began in Weekly Young Magazine in February 1996. Fukumoto stated that the original project did not have the main character's name as the series' title. Fukumoto did not want to make the character "so cool" and wanted the dullest name possible for him.

Assuming that people who will read Kaiji are not familiar with gambling manga, Fukumoto has stated that he created original gambling games in the series because they are easier to process than already existing games, allowing him to make simple and easy rules, adding as well that anything can become a gamble having an original game, and he can draw something surprising or interesting for the readers. To create a new game, Fukumoto first comes up with an idea and then a way to beat it, taking time to prepare tricks in order to win in a creative way, noting that persistence is key in the process.

Kaiji, and most of Fukumoto's other works as well, are drawn in a "cartoonish and loose" style. Fukumoto uses techniques like shake up the character's eyeballs and face to express their feelings. The titular character is drawn "sharper": he has an angular face, pointy chin and sharp nose, making it difficult to freehand draw him. Fukumoto uses a ruler and rotates the manuscript paper to draw him. For the antagonists, Fukumoto depicts their "ugliness" by bringing up a scary look in their eye and "threatening teeth." Fukumoto uses his trademark onomatopoeia, to express the characters' uneasiness. He also uses visual metaphors, like making Kaiji jump a large crevice or drawing him into a rushing torrent of water, to express the uneasy atmosphere. Women rarely appear in the series, being Mikoko Sakazaki the most prominent, and their appearance in gambling scenes are even more rare, as Fukumoto reportedly stated that he did not need women in the gambling world. Nevertheless, in July 2019, Fukumoto started Yami-ma no Mamiya, a gambling mahjong manga series, in which the protagonist is a female character.

The manga portrayals people's psychology in extreme situations, and the characters deal with betrayal and elaborate cons, desperately looking for ways to win. Fukumoto has stated that he cannot make manga where the characters readily make friends that they risk their lives for, and his protagonists are always alone, with no friends or followers, and Kaiji himself is frequently betrayed. Fukumoto considered that the antagonists, like Kazutaka Hyōdō and Yukio Tonegawa, are bad guys saying cruel things that maybe are true. By making Kaiji reflecting on his life and noticing his own faults, Fukumoto considered that the story is about maturation, as he wanted to draw a story in which the character gains something or changes in some way, so that he would be able to trust a person, even if he was previously betrayed.

Publication

Kaiji is written and illustrated by Nobuyuki Fukumoto. The manga began its serialization in Kodansha's seinen manga magazine Weekly Young Magazine on February 19, 1996. The manga is divided into six parts:

 (1996–1999, 13 volumes)
 (2000–2004, 13 volumes)
 (2004–2008, 13 volumes)
 (2009–2012, 10 volumes)
 (2013–2017, 16 volumes)
 (2017–present, 22 volumes)

In August 2018, it was announced at Otakon that the then new brand North American manga publishing company Denpa licensed the first part of the manga Gambling Apocalypse: Kaiji. It is being released in a six-volume omnibus edition with 500+ pages each one, and the first volume was published on November 12, 2019. In June 2020, Manga Planet announced the digital English-language publication of the manga. It was planned to start on June 23, 2020; however, it was postponed to November 18, 2020.

Spin-offs

A spin-off, titled , written by Tensei Hagiwara and illustrated by Tomohiro Hashimoto and Tomoki Miyoshi, was serialized in Kodansha's Monthly Young Magazine from June 20, 2015 to January 23, 2018. The manga was transferred to Comic Days manga app on March 5, 2018. The series finished on June 8, 2020. Kodansha collected its chapters into ten individual tankōbon volumes, published from December 4, 2015 to August 11, 2020.

A second spin-off series, titled  began serialization in the combined 4th and 5th issue of Weekly Young Magazine on December 26, 2016. The manga is written by Hagiwara and illustrated by Motomu Uehara and Kazuya Arai.

A third spin-off series, titled , written by Hagiwara and illustrated by Tomoki Miyoshi and Yoshiaki Seto, started in Kodansha's Morning on January 21, 2021.<ref></p></ref>

Related media

Anime

In August 2007, Weekly Young Magazine announced an anime television series adaptation of the first part of the manga. It ran for twenty-six episodes from October 3, 2007, to April 2, 2008, on Nippon TV. The episodes were collected into nine DVDs released by VAP between January 23 and September 26, 2008. VAP later re-released all the episodes on a DVD box set on October 7, 2009.

A second season with the same key staff, titled , was announced by Weekly Young Magazine in January 2011. Based on the second part of the manga, Tobaku Hakairoku Kaiji, it ran for twenty-six episodes on Nippon TV from April 6 to September 28, 2011. A scene depicting Kaiji throwing himself into large-stakes gambling by symbolically drawing him into a rushing torrent of water, was replaced due to the 2011 Tōhoku earthquake and tsunami, which occurred midway through the anime's production (Fukumoto donated 30 million yen (US$360,000) to the quake victims). The episodes were collected into nine DVDs released by VAP between June 22, 2011, and February 22, 2012. VAP also re-released all the episodes on two DVD box sets on September 21, 2011, and February 22, 2012.

In the United States, Kaiji: Ultimate Survivor was streamed on the Joost service in December 2008. In July 2013, Crunchyroll announced the streaming rights to both seasons. In November 2020, Sentai Filmworks announced that they have licensed both seasons of the series for streaming on select digital outlets and home video release. Both season were released in Japanese with English subtitles on Blu-ray Disc on April 20, 2021. In December 2021, Sentai Filmworks posted on Twitter a video with their ADR director Kyle Jones "accidentally" teasing that an English dub was in production for the series, with plans for a 2022 release. The English dub for the first nine episodes of Kaiji: Ultimate Survivor premiered on Hidive on November 28, 2022; episodes 10–15 premiered on February 21, 2023.

Music

The music for the anime series was composed by Hideki Taniuchi. The original soundtrack album for Kaiji: Ultimate Survivor was released by VAP on January 23, 2008. The original soundtrack album for Kaiji: Against All Rules was released on July 20, 2011.

Live-action films

Kaiji has been adapted into a trilogy of live-action films. The first film, Kaiji, was announced in October 2008. The film premiered on October 10, 2009 in Japan. Directed by Toya Sato, starring Tatsuya Fujiwara, Yūki Amami and Teruyuki Kagawa. In the UK, the first film was released on DVD by 4Digital Media under the title Kaiji: The Ultimate Gambler on July 26, 2010.

A sequel, Kaiji 2, was announced in November 2009. It was released on November 5, 2011. Directed by Toya Sato, starring Tatsuya Fujiwara, Yūsuke Iseya, Yuriko Yoshitaka, Katsuhisa Namase and Teruyuki Kagawa. Both movies are a little different from the manga/anime, both having alternate choices of what Kaiji did, but all have the same settings and events in different orders and rule changes in each gamble.

In May 2019, a third and final film, titled Kaiji: Final Game, with a completely original story by Fukumoto, was announced to premiere on January 10, 2020. Directed by Toya Sato, starring Tatsuya Fujiwara, Nagisa Sekimizu, Mackenyu, Sota Fukushi, Kōtarō Yoshida and Suzuki Matsuo. Other cast members includes Yūki Amami, Katshusa Namase, Ikusaburo Yamazaki, Masatō Ibu and Toshiki Seto. A novelization of the film by Van Madoy was released on November 14, 2019.

A more loosely adapted Chinese live-action movie, Animal World, starring Li Yifeng and Michael Douglas, was released on June 29, 2018 in China and other countries. Netflix acquired the global digital rights to the film.

Video games
, developed by Kodansha, was released for the PlayStation on May 25, 2000. , developed by Compile Heart, was released for the Nintendo DS on September 25, 2008. A PlayStation VR game, titled , was released on August 28, 2017. The game is developed by Solid Sphere and is based on the events depicted in the Castle of Despair arc of the first part of the manga. A version of the game was also launched for the Nintendo Switch on December 28, 2017.

Several pachinko and pachislot machines based on the series have been released. Sammy launched the pachislot  in December 2018. Takao have released multiple pachinko machines. The first, in 2007, the second, in 2009, the third, in 2011, the fourth, in 2012, the fifth,  in 2014, the sixth,  in 2017, the seventh, in 2018, and the eighth, also released in 2018.

Kaiji was featured in Level-5's game  Girl's RPG Cinderellife, launched for Nintendo 3DS in 2012. Kaiji and Mikoko Sakazaki were featured in a promotional collaboration for the massively multiplayer online role-playing game (MMORPG) Monster Hunter: Frontier G in 2016.

Stage show
A stage adaptation of the Restricted Rock–Paper–Scissors and Steel Beam Crossing arcs of the manga starring Taiki Yamazaki as Kaiji was announced on September 30, 2020 and ran on December 4–6, 2020 at Kyoto Theater, and then on December 10–13 at Hulic Hall Tokyo. It was directed by Akira Yamazaki and written by Azuki Mashiba, with Yutaka Narui serving as script supervisor. Fumihiko Tachiki, the narrator for the anime adaptations, reprised his role for the show.

Other media
A guidebook, titled , was published by Kodansha on October 28, 2011. It includes complete information about the series' first fifteen years of serialization. It also includes a one-shot "chapter 0", titled , originally published in Young Magazine Zōkan: Aka Buta #12 in 1997, and depicts a "what if" scenario where Kaiji chooses not to accept Endō's offer to board the Espoir.

Good Smile Company launched a figma figure of Kaiji Itō in August 2011.

In August 2011, when Kaiji reached its 500th chapter, Weekly Young Magazine published tribute illustrations by popular manga artists to celebrate Fukumoto's manga achievement, including Clamp, Tetsuya Chiba, Naoki Urasawa, Shuichi Shigeno, Jyoji Morikawa, Keisuke Itagaki, Hideo Yamamoto, and 12 others.

A Japanese variety show, titled , aired on TBS in December 2017. In the show, indebted contestants had the opportunity to earn money participating in different challenges inspired by the games of the manga. An application process was available in the program's official website until November 2017. Another variety show with the same topic, titled , was streamed in AbemaTV's AbemaSPECIAL Channel in April 2018.

Reception

General reception

Manga and anime
The manga had 18 million tankōbon copies in circulation by November 2011; over 20 million copies in circulation by July 2012; and over 21.5 million copies in circulation by January 2019. Individual volumes have been featured in Oricon's weekly charts of best-selling manga every year from 2009 through 2018. Kaiji is a popular series in Japan, and like Fukumoto's other work Akagi, it has a cult following overseas.

In 1998, along with Sōten Kōro, the manga won the 22nd Kodansha Manga Award in the general category.

In February 2015, Japanese website Goo Ranking conducted a "Top 10" online web poll of the "Best Cerebral Anime", where Kaiji ranked second, behind Death Note.

Live-action films
Overseas, the two films grossed , including $460,073 for Kaiji overseas and $68,175 for Kaiji 2 in Singapore.

In September 2011, Goo Ranking conducted a web poll of "Live-Action Manga/Anime Adaptations That Worked" and the first Kaiji film ranked sixth out of 38 live-action adaptations.

Critical reception
Michael Toole of Anime News Network praised the narrative of Kaiji, stating that "the series is run through with entertaining lowlifes, odd situations, and intoxicating moments of suspense." Bradley Meek of THEM Anime Reviews said: "[Kaiji]s one of the most unique anime I've ever seen, and I don't expect to see anything like it again." He praised the series' "ingenious games," depicting them as "devilishly clever and depend as much on the psychology of the players as it does strategy." Meek also wrote that the theme of the series is "the rich always screw over the poor" and the games could be seen as a "direct form social commentary." David Smith of IGN praised the games' rules development and strategies, but said that watching the titular protagonist "trip and fall into obvious traps is more than a little frustrating." Regarding the tone of the series, Theron Martin of Anime News Network wrote that the first episode of its second season "wars between being a psychological character study and just clinically depressing," and that could be a "turn-off," noting that the series is aimed at an older male audience. Gia Manry of the same website ranked the titular character second on her list of "Anime Characters with Terrible Karma." In comparing Kaiji to other gambling series like Fukumoto's other work Akagi, Shinobu Kaitani's One Outs or Fūmei Sai's The Legend of the Gambler: Tetsuya, John Oppliger of AnimeNation considered that Kaiji appeals to a wider audience due to its depiction of a variety of high-stakes games instead of focusing on a single kind of game, and due to the fact that the aforementioned series star "a prodigy rather than an ordinary guy," but stated that a "skilled gamesmanship" viewer could be disappointed with Kaiji by the "extensive reliance on coincidence, deus ex machina, and authorial manipulation" that "substitutes for intelligence and strategy." Norbert Daniels Jr. of Anime News Network wrote that Kaiji'''s story should resonate with American millennials and help them understand their common plight with the Lost Generation of Japan, adding: "Kaiji tells us that if we learn to stick together, we'll hit our jackpot eventually. Just like the show says, “The future is in our hands”." Chris Beveridge of The Fandom Post wrote: "Kaiji is a pretty fun show in small doses to dig into the wild and weird kinds of things that they come up with for the gambling matches. There’s a really interesting cast of characters that are introduced and some seriously intense situations that they’re put through."

The series' art style has been particularly commented by reviewers. Toole described Kaiji: Ultimate Survivor as "fantastically ugly" and "cheaply animated," and Martin stated that it uses a "very old-school artistic style," noting the use of "noses that are either huge or lethally sharp, extra-heavy lines in the character designs, and limited animation"; in another article, Martin said that the simplicity of the series' animation is "pretty clearly calculated" and "heavily stylized" due to Fukumoto's original art style. God Len of Japanator wrote that the artwork "is quite ‘unique’ to say the least. Noses are long, heads are misshapen, and something about their teeth really scares me. This look might be bad for most series out there today, but for Kaiji it works. The most important part is that it is consistent; and as long as its consistent, it works for me. Anyways, gamblers are supposed to be ugly." Daryl Surat of Otaku USA, commented that Fukumoto's "exaggerated facial expressions and contortions" of his character's design allows "selling the peaks and valleys of emotion that go with gambling matters of life, death, and big money." He also highlighted Fukumoto's trademark sound effect "Zawa Zawa", used to "denote minds ill at ease" and the "highly talkative and hard-selling" narrator, used to explain "how a big a deal everything is with a suitable mix of gravitas, bombast, and wild metaphor that is invariably realized through an outlandish fantasy visual." David Cabrera of Polygon commented about the series' "oppressive" atmosphere and said that Fukumoto "has a gift for presenting the abstract terror of staking one's life on a coin flip, mercilessly wringing every turn for maximum suspense and crawling all the way into his characters’ heads as they contemplate the unthinkable." He added that Kaiji himself is the key to make the series engaging and wrote: "he's cowardly, quick to tears, and the moment he gets comfortable he's guaranteed to screw everything up. But when Kaiji has his back to the wall, you can't help but root for his big comeback."TechRadar included Kaiji among its list of "31 fantastic anime series" and called it "high bar of the niche subgenre of gambling anime." They added: "Kaiji's flaws make him an unlikely but sympathetic protagonist, which helps build the tension as he's forced into increasingly desperate gambles and drawn out psychological battles. You want him to win, to be redeemed, and to actually learn his lesson, but this show has too much to say about class, privilege and the self-destructive nature of hope to make his road to redemption easy." Crunchyroll listed the second season Kaiji: Against All Rules among the best anime series of 2011, with reviewer Joseph Luster commenting, "Ideally, Kaiji would be super popular in North America. I'd certainly like to think it would blow up if someone licensed it, but who knows. Still, if you managed to catch the second season this year, you know how dangerously addictive it can be. Zawa zawa, indeed."

Legacy
Manga author Homura Kawamoto, writer of Kakegurui, stated that Kaiji served as an influence to his series. South Korean film director and writer Hwang Dong-hyuk mentioned that Kaiji served as an inspiration for the 2021 television series Squid Game''.

See also
Gambling in Japan

Notes

References

Further reading

External links
  
  
  
  
  
  
 
  
  
 
 

Kaiji
Action anime and manga
Anime series based on manga
Anime and manga about gambling
Kodansha manga
Madhouse (company)
Mahjong in anime and manga
Manga adapted into films
Nobuyuki Fukumoto
Nippon TV original programming
Psychological anime and manga
Seinen manga
Sentai Filmworks
Suspense anime and manga
Winner of Kodansha Manga Award (General)
Yakuza in anime and manga